Troglomorphism is the morphological adaptation of an animal to living in the constant darkness of caves, characterised by features such as loss of pigment, reduced eyesight or blindness, and frequently with attenuated bodies or appendages. The terms troglobitic, stygobitic, stygofauna, troglofauna, and hypogean or hypogeic, are often used for cave-dwelling organisms.

A 2012 study by a team from the National University of Singapore found that reductive changes in freshwater cave crabs evolved at the same rate as constructive changes. This shows that both selection and evolution have a role in advancing reductive changes (e.g smaller eyes) and constructive changes (e.g larger claws), making troglomorphic adaptations subject to strong factors that affect an organism's morphology.

Troglomorphism occurs in molluscs, velvet worms, arachnids, myriapods, crustaceans, insects, fish, amphibians (notably cave salamanders) and reptiles. To date no mammals or birds have been found to live exclusively in caves. Pickerel frogs are classed as either trogloxenes, or possibly troglophiles. The first Troglobiont to be described was Leptodirus hochenwartii.

See also 
 List of troglobites

References

External links 
 "The Olm and Other Troglobites"

Animal morphology
Cave animals